This is the discography of Cantopop artist William So.

Singles

Studio albums

Compilation albums

Live albums

Pop music discographies
So, William